Ortensio Battisti (died 1594) was a Roman Catholic prelate who served as Bishop of Veroli (1567–1594).

On 28 November 1567, Ortensio Battisti was appointed during the papacy of Pope Pius V as Bishop of Veroli.
On 8 December 1567, he was consecrated bishop by Egidio Valenti, Bishop of Nepi e Sutri, with Nicola Perusco, Bishop of Civita Castellana e Orte, and Matteo Andrea Guerra, Bishop of Fondi, serving as co-consecrators. 
He served as Bishop of Veroli until his death in 1594.

References

External links and additional sources
 (for Chronology of Bishops)
 (for Chronology of Bishops)

16th-century Italian Roman Catholic bishops
Bishops appointed by Pope Pius V
1594 deaths